Cliff Godwin (born February 2, 1978) is an American baseball coach and former catcher, who is the current head baseball coach of the East Carolina Pirates. He played college baseball at East Carolina from 1998 to 2001 for head coach Keith LeClair.

Early years
Godwin was raised in Snow Hill, North Carolina. He attended Greene Central High School in Snow Hill.

Playing career
Godwin enrolled at East Carolina University to play for the Pirates. He red-shirted his freshman season. Over the next four years, he started 126 games as a catcher, and served three years as team co-captain. He batted .322 with 15 home runs and RBIs as a senior and was named 1st team All-Colonial Athletic Association.

In addition to his playing career at East Carolina, Godwin also graduated magna cum laude in 2000 with a Bachelor of Science in management information systems, and went on to earn his MBA from ECU in 2002. He was a two-time Academic All-American selection during his time as a player.

After graduating, Godwin spent two years playing professionally with the Gateway Grizzlies and the Evansville Otters of the Frontier League.

Coaching career
After his two years in the Frontier League, Godwin began his coaching career as an assistant at Kinston High School in Kinston, North Carolina, 20 minutes from his hometown of Snow Hill. He spent one season at Kinston before moving on to his first position at the Division I level, with the UNC Wilmington Seahawks. He spent two seasons at UNC Wilmington before moving on to Vanderbilt.

At Vanderbilt, he served as the Commodores' Director of Baseball Operations before joining Paul Mainieri's staff at Notre Dame for the 2005 season. After two seasons at Notre Dame, he followed Mainieri to LSU prior to the 2007 season. In 2008, Godwin's LSU offense hit .306 with 100 home runs and 95 stolen bases.

After two seasons with Mainieri at LSU, which included a trip to the College World Series in 2008, Godwin coached at UCF. With UCF, he helped with numerous highly ranked recruiting classes and helped lead the Knights to the NCAA Tournament in 2011, their first appearance since 2004. Following his stint at UCF, Godwin moved on to Ole Miss, where he served as an assistant coach and recruiting coordinator. In 2014, he helped lead the Rebels to their first College World Series appearance since 1972.

On June 25, 2014, Godwin was hired as head coach at his alma mater, East Carolina University, replacing former Pirates head coach Billy Godwin.

Godwin's first career game as a head coach came on February 13, 2015, a 3–1 loss to Virginia. His first win came on February 21, 2015, against UNC Greensboro.

Head coaching record
The following is a table of Godwin's yearly records as an NCAA head baseball coach.

References

Living people
1978 births
Baseball coaches from North Carolina
UNC Wilmington Seahawks baseball coaches
Vanderbilt Commodores baseball coaches
Notre Dame Fighting Irish baseball coaches
LSU Tigers baseball coaches
UCF Knights baseball coaches
Ole Miss Rebels baseball coaches
East Carolina Pirates baseball coaches
East Carolina Pirates baseball players
People from Snow Hill, North Carolina
Evansville Otters players
Gateway Grizzlies players